Glipa impressipennis is a species of beetle in the genus Glipa. It was described in 1924.

References

impressipennis
Beetles described in 1924